Antonino Cayetano Díaz (born 27 May 1979) is a Mexican politician from the Party of the Democratic Revolution. In 2012 he served as Deputy of the LXI Legislature of the Mexican Congress representing Guerrero.

References

1979 births
Living people
Politicians from Guerrero
Party of the Democratic Revolution politicians
21st-century Mexican politicians
Deputies of the LXI Legislature of Mexico
Members of the Chamber of Deputies (Mexico) for Guerrero